Matthew Reynolds may refer to:
 Matthew A. Reynolds, United States Assistant Secretary of State for Legislative Affairs
 Matt Reynolds (pitcher) (born 1984), former baseball pitcher
 Matt Reynolds (infielder) (born 1990), baseball infielder
 Matt Reynolds (baseball coach)
 Matt Reynolds (American football) (born 1986), American football offensive tackle for the Kansas City Chiefs